Diguvadarapalle is a village in Rowthulapudi Mandal, Kakinada district in the state of Andhra Pradesh in India.

Geography 

Demographics 
 India census, Diguvadarapalle had a population of 130, out of which 66 were male and 64 were female. The population of children below 6 years of age was 16. The literacy rate of the village was 32.46%.

References 

Villages in Rowthulapudi mandal